John Howard Merritt (October 12, 1894 – November 3, 1955) was an outfielder in Major League Baseball. He played one game for the New York Giants in 1913.

References

External links

1894 births
1955 deaths
Major League Baseball outfielders
New York Giants (NL) players
Baseball players from Mississippi
Sportspeople from Tupelo, Mississippi
Knoxville Reds players
Clarksdale Swamp Angels players
Fort Worth Panthers players
Memphis Chickasaws players
San Antonio Bronchos players
Chattanooga Lookouts players
Houston Buffaloes players
St. Paul Saints (AA) players
Atlanta Crackers players
Mobile Bears players